Highway 28 (AR 28, Ark. 28, and Hwy. 28) is designation for three east–west state highways in Western Arkansas. Two segments together running from the Oklahoma state line to Ola (with a gap along US Highway 71 around Waldron) have been established since the original 1926 Arkansas state highway numbering, with the third segment designated in 1963. All three highways are rural, two-lane roads with relatively low traffic serving a sparsely populated and forested part of Arkansas. The highways are maintained by the Arkansas Department of Transportation (ARDOT).

Route description
No segment of Highway 28 has been listed as part of the National Highway System, a network of roads important to the nation's economy, defense, and mobility.

Oklahoma to US 71
The highway begins at the Oklahoma state line from Oklahoma State Highway 128 (SH-128) near the unincorporated community of Bates. The highway follows an ecoregion boundary between the flat Arkansas River Valley and the Ouachita Mountains, as well as the Arkansas Southern Railroad tracks. Highway 28 runs east as a two-lane road through the Ouachita National Forest in a sparsely populated segment of oak-hickory-pine forest. The highway passes the historic Bates School, listed on the National Register of Historic Places. It continues east through Cauthron and Oliver before emerging from the Ouachita National Forest near Hon. In Hon, Highway 28 serves as the western terminus of Highway 80, before continuing east to Evening Shade. Just east of Evening Shade, Highway 28 intersects US Highway 71 (US 71), where it terminates north of Waldron.

The ArDOT maintains Highway 28 like all other parts of the state highway system. As a part of these responsibilities, the department tracks the volume of traffic using its roads in surveys using a metric called average annual daily traffic (AADT). The ArDOT estimates the traffic level for a segment of roadway for any average day of the year in these surveys. In 2018, this segment had an AADT below 1000 VPD along the entire length, with the highest count being 930 VPD west of the Highway 80 intersection.  For reference, the American Association of State Highway and Transportation Officials (AASHTO) classifies roads with fewer than 400 vehicles per day as a very low volume local road.

Needmore to Ola
A second segment of Highway 28 begins at US 71 at Needmore in the Fourche Mountains south of Waldron in Scott County. The two-lane highway runs east along the long, east-west forested ridges of the Ouachita Mountains to Parks, where it passes the NRHP-listed Parks School. Continuing east, Highway 28 enters the Ouachita National Forest, bridges the Fourche La Fave River twice, and passes the unincorporated communities of Harvey and Nola before leaving the Ouachita National Forest and entering Yell County.

Entering in the southwestern part of Yell County, Highway 28 continues east through Gravelly and another crossing of the Fourche La Fave River before an intersection with Highway 307 at Bluffton. Highway 28 turns northeast and runs through Fourche Valley to Briggsville, where there is another intersection with Highway 307. Highway 28 begins skirting the edge of the Ouachita National Forest, passing through Wing to Rover, where it intersects Highway 27, forming a concurrency northward. After , Highway  28 turns right and heads toward Plainview. Entering the city as Main Street, Highway 28 passes the former Plainview-Rover High School, post office, city hall, and the Plainview Medical Clinic before intersecting Highway 60 (Spring Avenue). Highway 28 turns northward at this junction, leaving Plainview and passing through a rural area before entering the small city of Ola. Entering from the city's southwest corner, Highway 28 passes Lake Ola-Dale before a junction with Highway 7, where it terminates. 

Much of Highway 28 between US 71 and Highway 27 had under 700 VPD in ARDOT's 2018 survey. Traffic increases heading east from the concurrency, reaching a peak of 2,400 VPD west of Ola.

Mount George to Dardanelle
A third segment of Highway 28 begins in eastern Yell County at Mount George in an intersection with Highway 154 near the Petit Jean River Wildlife Management Area. The two-lane road runs northeast through the unincorporated community of Pigsah and rural areas to Dardanelle, the Yell County seat. Highway 28 runs along the city limits near Dardanelle High School before terminating at an intersection with Highway 7 (Scenic Highway 7).

Highway 28 AADT in 2018 ranged from a low of 590 VPD near the western terminus, to 1700 VPD near Dardanelle in ARDOT's 2018 survey.

History

During the 1926 Arkansas state highway numbering, State Road 28 was designated from Oklahoma to Ola, largely along the present-day route, with a gap along US 71. The Highway 28 designation was duplicated when the Arkansas State Highway Commission designated a county road between Mount George and Dardanelle as a state highway on April 24, 1963. The Highway Commission initially sought to close the gap in Highway 28 around Waldron in May 1973 when a new location US 71 was being constructed around the city, but two months later rescinded the order and designated the former US 71 through Waldron as US Highway 71 Business (US 71B) instead.

Major intersections
Mile markers reset at concurrencies.

Gallery

See also

 List of state highways in Arkansas

References

External links

028
Transportation in Scott County, Arkansas
Transportation in Yell County, Arkansas